Jorge García Marín (born 23 April 1980 in Zaragoza) is a former Spanish racing cyclist. He rode in 3 editions of the Vuelta a España.

Palmarès
2004
1st Stage 4 Volta a la Comunitat Valenciana

References

1980 births
Living people
Spanish male cyclists
Sportspeople from Zaragoza